Frank Wheeler Mondell (November 6, 1860August 6, 1939) was a United States representative of Wyoming.

Biography
Born in St. Louis, Missouri, he was educated in the public schools. For many years he was engaged in farming, stock-raising, and railroad construction.  He settled in the Wyoming Territory in 1887, was mayor of Newcastle from 1888 to 1895, and  served in Congress from 1895 to 1897 and once again from 1899 to 1923. He was majority leader in the Sixty-sixth and Sixty-seventh Congresses on the floor of the House and took a prominent part in framing the legislation passed by that body.  He took an active part in all the Republican conventions from 1902 to 1924 when he was a chairman at the 1924 Republican National Convention. He died in 1939 in Washington, D.C.

References

External links
 
 

Majority leaders of the United States House of Representatives
1860 births
1939 deaths
Republican Party members of the United States House of Representatives from Wyoming
Presidents of the Wyoming Senate
People from Newcastle, Wyoming